Lesticus purpurascens is a species of ground beetle in the subfamily Pterostichinae. It was described by Straneo in 1959.

References

Lesticus
Beetles described in 1959